is a Japanese former competitive figure skater. He is the 1994 Japanese national champion and placed 22nd at the 1994 Winter Olympics. After retiring from competition, he became a journalist.

Results

References

1973 births
Living people
Japanese male single skaters
Olympic figure skaters of Japan
Figure skaters at the 1994 Winter Olympics
Waseda University alumni
Sportspeople from Sendai